Glen N. J. Adam (born 22 May 1959 in New Zealand) was an association football player who represented New Zealand gaining 16 A-International caps between 1978 and 1984, scoring one goal.

He was a member the All Whites squad at the 1982 FIFA World Cup in Spain, where they lost all 3 group games to Scotland, USSR and Brazil.

External links

References

1959 births
Living people
Association football defenders
New Zealand international footballers
New Zealand association footballers
Place of birth missing (living people)
1980 Oceania Cup players
1982 FIFA World Cup players